Deadmau5 Circa 1998–2002 is a self-released compilation album by Canadian electronic music producer Deadmau5, released under the name Halcyon441 on his SectionZ page. The compilation features tracks (or variants of tracks) that were released on his 2005 debut album Get Scraped. Zimmerman later re-released the tracks "Screen Door", "Long Walk Off A Short Pier", "Superlover", "Obsidian", and a reworked version of "My Opinion" on his 2017 compilation album Stuff I Used to Do.
The compilation's tracks have been uploaded to social networking site YouTube, but most of the songs have approximately five seconds cut from the beginning due to technical error.

Songs 
Deadmau5 Circa 1998-2002 features the song "Aural Psynapse", which would be remade and re-released in 2011, as well as the track "Feelin' Fresh", which the 2010 track "Cthulhu Sleeps" (from 4×4=12) would be loosely based on.
In addition, a fragment of the song "Dig This" was used on the track "Bounce" (from the album "Vexillology", in 2006)

"Bored of Canada" is assumed to refer to Scottish IDM act Boards of Canada. This track would later feature on Zimmerman's 2005 album Get Scraped and his 2008 compilation Project 56.

Track listing

References

External links
 

Deadmau5 albums
2006 albums